Paulus Barbus (Paul Soncinas) (b. at Soncino, Lombardy, from where comes the name of Soncinas which appears at the head of his books; d. at Cremona, 4 August 1494) was an Italian Dominican philosopher and theologian.

Life

When still very young he entered the Dominican Order and made his philosophical and theological studies in its schools. He afterwards taught philosophy and theology at Milan, Ferrara, and Bologna.

Works

He was esteemed by contemporary scholars, and notably by Pico della Mirandola. Many of his writings were lost at an early date.

The following have been printed frequently: 
 "Quaestiones super divina sapientia Aristotelis" (principal edition, Lyons, 1579); 
 "Divinum Epitoma quaestionum in IV libros senentiarum a principe Thomistarum Joanne Capreolo Tolesano disputatarum" (principal edition, Pavia, 1522)
The place and date of "In libros praedicabilium et praedicamentorum expositio" are unknown.

References

Attribution
 The entry cites:
Quétif and Échard, Scriptores Ordinis Praedicatorum, I, 279

1494 deaths
Italian Dominicans
15th-century Italian Roman Catholic theologians
Year of birth unknown